Rusty & Doug were a country music and cajun music duo composed of Doug Kershaw (born January 24, 1936) and his younger brother, Rusty Kershaw (February 2, 1938 – October 23, 2001).

The two recorded for Hickory Records between 1955 and 1961, charting five times on the Hot Country Songs charts. They also performed on the Louisiana Hayride and Wheeling Jamboree.  They became members of the Grand Ole Opry in the 1950s.

The duo broke up in 1959 as both brothers entered the United States Army, but reunited between 1961 and 1963. Doug continued as a solo artist.
Rusty Kershaw played on the Neil Young album "On The Beach" in 1974.He played Slide Guitar on 'Motion Pictures' and Fiddle on 'Ambulance Blues'
Rusty Kershaw died of a heart attack on October 23, 2001, at the age of 63.

Singles

References

American country music groups
American bluegrass music groups
Country music duos
Grand Ole Opry members
Musical groups established in 1955
Musical groups disestablished in 1963
Musical groups from Louisiana
American folk musical groups
1955 establishments in Louisiana